Euston Tower is a skyscraper located on Euston Road in the London Borough of Camden.  To its east is Hampstead Road.

History
The site was developed by Joe Levy who bought properties along the north side of Euston Road to enable him to build a complex of two tower blocks with office shops and apartments. The building, which was designed by Sidney Kaye Eric Firmin & Partners in the International style and built by George Wimpey, was completed in 1970. Early tenants included Inmarsat and Capital Radio.

References

Office buildings completed in 1970
Skyscrapers in the London Borough of Camden